Soldier Five – The Real Truth About the Bravo Two Zero Mission is the third book about the Bravo Two Zero mission during the Gulf War to have been written by a member of the eight-man patrol involved.

It is published under the pseudonym "Mike Coburn", but the author is the member referred to as "Mark the Kiwi" in other accounts.

It is more critical of the command structure than other accounts had been and the book was only published after a lengthy and expensive series of court battles, and by court order the resulting royalties go to the UK Ministry of Defence.

The New Zealand Court of Appeal upheld the confidentiality contract signed by Coburn as a member of UK special forces, ruling that there was valid consideration, that it was not an unconscionable bargain, and that it was not the result of duress or undue influence. However, the Court declined to order an injunction against its publication, noting that Coburn had not waived his right to freedom of expression and that the matters contained in the book were now in the public domain.

See also
 Bravo Two Zero (actual events)
 Bravo Two Zero (1993 book)
 The One That Got Away (1995 book)

References

2004 non-fiction books
Gulf War books
British non-fiction books
Works about the Special Air Service
Works published under a pseudonym